Saluppaptti is a small village near the Western Ghats in the Madurai district in India. It is located 45 km west from Madurai town. The village was under the Saptur Polygar territory during British India  and the villagers engaged to saptur polygar troops and administration. Now this village comes under the Sedapatti block. 

Villages in Madurai district